PROMAL (PROgrammer's Microapplication Language) is a structured programming language from Systems Management Associates for MS-DOS, Commodore 64, and Apple II. PROMAL features simple syntax, no line numbers, long variable names, functions and procedures with argument passing, real number type, arrays, strings, pointer, and a built-in I/O library. Like ABC and Python, indentation is part of the language syntax.

The language uses a single-pass compiler to generate byte code that is interpreted when the program is run. Since the memory is very limited on these early home computers, the compiler can compile to/from disk and memory. The software package for C64 includes a full-screen editor and command shell.

See also [Computer Language, Mar 1986, pp. 128–134].

Reception
Ahoy! called PROMAL for the Commodore 64 "one of the best" structured languages. It concluded "As an introduction to structured programming languages and as an alternative to BASIC, PROMAL is well worth the time needed to learn it and the $49.95 to purchase it".

Example Code
From the PROMAL program disk:

  PROGRAM SIEVE
    ; Sieve of Eratosthenes Benchmark
    ; test (BYTE magazine)
    ; 10 iterations, 1800 element array.
  INCLUDE LIBRARY
  CON SIZE=1800
  WORD I
  WORD J
  WORD PRIME
  WORD K
  WORD COUNT
  BYTE FLAGS[SIZE]
  
  BEGIN
  OUTPUT "10 ITERATIONS"
  FOR J= 1 TO 10
    COUNT=0
    FILL FLAGS, SIZE, TRUE
    FOR I= 0 TO SIZE
      IF FLAGS[I]
        PRIME=I+I+3
        K=I+PRIME
        WHILE K <= SIZE
          FLAGS[K]=FALSE
          K=K+PRIME
        COUNT=COUNT+1
  OUTPUT "#C#I PRIMES", COUNT
  END

References

External links 
PROMAL for the Commodore 64
PROMAL - Trademark Details

C programming language family